Walter Pettit Tricker (1823–1907) was a notable New Zealand farmer, soldier and victim of injustice. He was born in Stowupland, Suffolk, England in about 1823.

References

1823 births
1907 deaths
New Zealand military personnel
English emigrants to New Zealand